Sadr is a Persian surname. People with the surname include:

 Ali Sadr Hasheminejad, known as Ali Sadr (born 1980), American businessman
 Behjat Sadr (1924–2009), Iranian painter
 Fazlollah Sadr, Iranian politician
 Hamid Reza Sadr (1956–2021), Iranian journalist
 Ibrahim Sadr, Afghan politician
 Javad Sadr (1912–1990), Iranian diplomat and politician
 Mohsen Sadr (1871–1962), Iranian politician
 Movayyed Hoseini Sadr (born 1970), Iranian politician
 Reza Sadr (born 1932), Iranian politician 
 Shadi Sadr (born 1974), Iranian lawyer and journalist
 Shahabedin Sadr (born 1962),  Iranian physician and politician
 Wafaa El-Sadr (born 1950), Egyptian American physician

Persian-language surnames